is a Japanese ski jumper. His career achievements include a gold medal at the 1992 Ski Flying World Championships, winning the 1999 Nordic Tournament, individual silver medal at the 2014 Winter Olympics, and two individual bronze medals at the 2003 Ski Jumping World Championships.

During his career, Kasai has broken numerous ski jumping records. In 2016, he was honoured with two Guinness World Records certificates for the most individual World Cup starts, not only in ski jumping, but in all World Cup disciplines organized by the International Ski Federation. At World Cup level, Kasai competed for a total of 32 seasons between 1988–89 and 2022–23.

Career

1988: World Cup debut 

Kasai made his World Cup debut on 17 December 1988 in Sapporo, Japan, at the age of 16, reaching 31st place. A year later he performed in his first Nordic World Championships in Lahti, Finland.

1992: World champion 
He won his first and to date only major championship at the FIS Ski Flying World Championships 1992 in Harrachov, Czechoslovakia. He won after a second day of competition which was cancelled after strong winds and a crash of Christof Duffner. At that time he was among the world's top jumpers, known for his extraordinary style, holding his body almost flat between his skis.

1994: Olympic team medal 
In 1994, he was a member of the Japanese national team that won a silver medal in the team large hill and finished fifth in the individual large hill at the Winter Olympics in Lillehammer. After breaking his shoulder he missed the entire 1994/95 season.

1999: Nordic Tournament 
In 1999, Kasai won the ski jumping competition at the Holmenkollen Ski Festival and Nordic Tournament overall title. He collected a total of seven medals at the Nordic World Championships, including two silver (team large hill in 1999 and 2003) and five bronze medals (individual normal hill and individual large hill in 2003, team large hill in 2007 and 2009, and mixed team normal hill in 2015). At the 2010 Winter Olympics in Vancouver, he finished eighth on the large hill and 17th on the normal hill.

2014: Oldest Olympic medalist 
At the 2014 Winter Olympics in Sochi he competed in a record seventh Olympics and took the silver medal in the large hill individual and the bronze in team large hill, becoming the oldest ski jumper ever to take a medal at the winter Olympics.

On 29 November 2014 Kasai became the oldest World Cup winner when he shared the victory with Simon Ammann in Ruka, Finland.

On 22 February 2015 Kasai won the bronze medal at the FIS Nordic World Ski Championships 2015 in mixed team event and became the oldest medalist at the Nordic World Ski Championships. He performed for a record twelfth time in the competition.

2016: 500th World Cup start 

On 4 March 2016 he was on a World Cup podium in Wisła at the age of 43 years and 272 days, which is a record for the oldest contestant to mount the podium in ski jumping history. On 17 March 2016 in Planica, he reached his 500th individual start in the World Cup.

2018 Olympics 
Kasai finished 21st in the normal hill event at the 2018 Winter Olympics.

Major tournament results

Olympics

FIS World Nordic Ski Championships

Ski Flying World Championships

World Cup

Standings

Individual wins

Individual starts 
Kasai was three times on the starting list but did not start, at Bischofshofen in 1997, Garmisch-Partenkirchen in 1998, and Lahti in 2014.

Records 

During his career, Kasai broke numerous ski jumping records and age milestones. He is the oldest athlete to ever perform in the FIS Ski Jumping World Cup and holds the record for the most appearances in the competition, with a total of 569 individual starts (640 including team events) in 32 seasons between 1988–89 and 2022–23. Kasai also holds a record number of appearances in ski jumping at the Winter Olympics (21 starts), FIS Nordic World Ski Championships (42 starts), and FIS Ski Flying World Championships (13 starts). In 2016, he was awarded with two Guinness World Records certificates for "the most appearances in FIS Nordic World Ski Championships by an individual ski jumper" and "the most individual starts in FIS Ski Jumping World Cup competitions". In November 2014, Kasai became the oldest individual World Cup event winner, aged 42 years and 5 months. He is also the oldest competitor to make a World Cup podium, aged 44 years and 9 months.

Kasai is the first athlete in history to participate at eight Winter Olympics (between 1992 and 2018). At the 2014 Winter Olympics, he became the oldest Olympic medalist in ski jumping after winning a silver medal aged 41 years and 254 days.

Personal life 
On 30 January 2016 his wife gave birth to their daughter named Rino.

See also 
 List of athletes with the most appearances at Olympic Games

References

External links 
 
 
 

1972 births
Japanese male ski jumpers
Living people
Olympic ski jumpers of Japan
Sportspeople from Hokkaido
Ski jumpers at the 1992 Winter Olympics
Ski jumpers at the 1994 Winter Olympics
Ski jumpers at the 1998 Winter Olympics
Ski jumpers at the 2002 Winter Olympics
Ski jumpers at the 2006 Winter Olympics
Ski jumpers at the 2010 Winter Olympics
Ski jumpers at the 2014 Winter Olympics
Ski jumpers at the 2018 Winter Olympics
Olympic silver medalists for Japan
Olympic medalists in ski jumping
FIS Nordic World Ski Championships medalists in ski jumping
Medalists at the 1994 Winter Olympics
Medalists at the 2014 Winter Olympics
Olympic bronze medalists for Japan
Holmenkollen Ski Festival winners
Holmenkollen medalists